Edachira is an area in the Kakkanad region of Kochi city in Kerala, India. Situated in the eastern part of the city, Edachira was pushed to the forefront of Kerala's IT map with the establishment of InfoPark and SmartCity.

Apartments
Edachira has many large residential areas including flat complexes like Skyline Ivy League, Oxoniya Infocity Vintage , DD Diamond Valley, Manjooran Scarlet and many more.

Transport 
Edachira is well connected with other parts of the city via road network. The approved second phase of Kochi Metro will also pass through Edachira.

Schools
Mar Thoma Public School
Mar Thoma School of Management Studies

Regions of Kochi
Cities and towns in Ernakulam district
Neighbourhoods in Kochi